Jung Eun-gwol is a South Korean novelist. Three of her bestselling books have been adapted into television dramas – Sungkyunkwan Scandal (KBS2, 2010) and Moon Embracing the Sun (MBC, 2012) and Lovers of the Red Sky (SBS, 2021).

Works

References

External links
Jung Eun-gwol at Daum

South Korean women novelists
South Korean novelists
Living people
20th-century novelists
20th-century women writers
Year of birth missing (living people)